The 2001 Asian Wrestling Championships were held in Ulaanbaatar, Mongolia. The event took place from June 5 to June 10, 2001.

Medal table

Team ranking

Medal summary

Men's freestyle

Men's Greco-Roman

Women's freestyle

Participating nations 
193 competitors from 15 nations competed.

 (21)
 (11)
 (21)
 (16)
 (21)
 (16)
 (14)
 (2)
 (22)
 (4)
 (3)
 (6)
 (18)
 (6)
 (12)

References
Freestyle Results
Greco-Roman and Women Results

External links
UWW Database

Asia
Wre
Asian Wrestling Championships
W